Arms and the Girl is a 1950 Broadway musical with a book by Herbert Fields, Dorothy Fields, and Rouben Mamoulian, music by Morton Gould, and lyrics by Dorothy Fields. The show is based on the play The Pursuit of Happiness by Lawrence Langner and Armina Marshall. It opened at the Richard Rodgers Theatre on February 2, 1950, and closed on May 27 after 134 performances.

The show is set during the American Revolution.

Songs

Act l 

 A Girl With a Flame
 That's What I Told Him Last Night
 I Like It Here
 That's My Fella
 A Cow and a Plough and a Frau
 Nothin' for Nothing'''
 He Will Tonight Plantation in Philadelphia You Kissed Me Act ll 

 Don't Talk (reprise) I'll Never Learn There Must Be Something Better Than Love She's Exciting Mister Washington! Uncle George A Cow and a Plough and a Frau (reprise)''

Cast

References 

1950 musicals
Broadway musicals
Cultural depictions of George Washington
Musicals inspired by real-life events
Plays about the American Revolution
Plays set in the United States